Yan Haibin (Chinese: 嚴海濱; born 8 January 2003) is a Chinese sprinter.

International rankings

International 
Haibin is the current Asian record holder of the 4 x 200m relay.

2020 Summer Olympics 
Haibin was one of 406 Chinese athletes to compete at the 2020 Tokyo Summer Olympics. He finished fourth place in the Men's 4 x 100m Relay.

References 

Living people
2003 births
Chinese sprinters
Olympic athletes of China
Athletes (track and field) at the 2020 Summer Olympics